Adolphe Alésina (born 27 May 1969) is a French rugby league player. He is the son of the former rugby league player of the same name.

Rugby league career

Club 

Pamiers
 AS Carcassonne XIII
 XIII Catalan
 XIII Limouxin

International caps 

 France (5 caps) 1991 to 1993, against:
 Great Britain : 1991, 1993,
 Papua New Guinea : 1991,
 CIS (former USSR): 1992.

Notes and references 

1969 births
Living people
AS Carcassonne players
France national rugby league team players
French rugby league players
Limoux Grizzlies players
Rugby league centres
XIII Catalan players